Torodora chiangdoica is a moth in the family Lecithoceridae. It was described by Kyu-Tek Park in 2002. It is found in Thailand.

The wingspan is 13–14 mm. The forewings are similar to those of Torodora moriyasu, but narrower.

Etymology
The species name is derived from Chiang Mai, the type locality.

References

Moths described in 2002
Torodora